Sympistis youngi is a moth of the  family Noctuidae. It is found in North America.

The wingspan is about 35 mm.

External links
 Images at mothphotographersgroup

youngi
Taxa named by James Halliday McDunnough
Moths described in 1922